Beaver Lake is a man-made reservoir in the Ozark Mountains of Northwest Arkansas and is formed by a dam across the White River. With towering limestone bluffs, natural caves, and a wide variety of trees and flowering shrubs, it is a popular tourist destination. Beaver Lake is the source of drinking water in Northwest Arkansas, which is managed, treated and sold by Beaver Water District.

Beaver Dam

Beaver Dam was authorized by the Flood Control Act of 1944 and other following acts. The United States Army Corps of Engineers constructed Beaver Dam during the years 1960-1966, impounding a major part of the White River and creating Beaver Lake and flooding much of the valley including the remains of the historic resort town Monte Ne. Construction of the powerhouse and switch yard began in 1963. Power generation began in May 1965 and continues today. The initial cost of the project was $60 million. This is also the first dam in the tailwater chain to provide cold water fishery along the White River.

Recreation
The Army Corps of Engineers has also constructed a variety of recreational facilities around the lake. Paved access roads wind through twelve developed parks.  These parks have modern campsites offering electricity and fire rings with drinking water, showers, and restrooms nearby. Other facilities, such as picnic sites, swimming beaches, hiking trails, boat launching ramps, and sanitary dump stations are also available in the parks. There are 12 recreation areas with 677 campsites along with 7 full-service commercial marina concessions, which hold 1,750 rental slips. There are 9 limited motel / resort leases and 28 boat ramps licensed to County or State. There are 8 national bass tournaments per year and many other fishing tournaments. There are 3.1 million visitors annually.

The Hobbs State Park-Conservation Area (formerly known as the Beaver Lake State Park) is the only State Park in Benton County, Arkansas.

Geography
The majority of Beaver Lake is located in Benton County.  The dam itself is located in west Carroll County. Parts of the lake extend into Washington County and Madison County.

U.S. Route 62 runs along the north and west sides of Beaver Lake.  Highway 12 roughly follows Beaver Lake for much of its length.

Hydropower 
The powerplant operates two main 56 MW turbines in one house unit. Total power generation capacity is 6,347,345 MWh. The revenue from power generation is returned to the US federal government to pay for the purchase price of the dam.

Flood control
Beaver Lake is the first of several flood control lakes on the White river watershed. Beaver Lakes holds back flood water from Table Rock Lake. The estimated flood damages prevented in 2007 are $1.3 million. Since its creation, the Beaver Lake is estimated to have prevented $52.5 billion in damage.

See also 
 List of Arkansas dams and reservoirs

References

External links 

 

Lakes of the U.S. Interior Highlands
Reservoirs in Arkansas
Protected areas of Benton County, Arkansas
Protected areas of Carroll County, Arkansas
White River (Arkansas–Missouri)
Buildings and structures in Benton County, Arkansas
Buildings and structures in Carroll County, Arkansas
Protected areas of Washington County, Arkansas
Protected areas of Madison County, Arkansas
Ozarks
Bodies of water of the Ozarks
Bodies of water of Benton County, Arkansas
Bodies of water of Carroll County, Arkansas
Bodies of water of Washington County, Arkansas
Bodies of water of Madison County, Arkansas
1960s establishments in Arkansas